Doctor Pedro Barriere (died 18 May 1827) was a Spanish colonial official in the Intendancy of San Salvador from 1819 until 1821. After independence from Spain, he became the first head of state of the Province of San Salvador and served for two months in late-1821.

Early life 

Pedro Barriere was born in the Captaincy General of Cuba which was a part of the Spanish Empire. He entered the service of the colonial government at the end of the eighteenth century, ascending to the rank of lieutenant. During the Spanish American wars of independence, Barriere fought for Spanish royalist soldiers against those seeking independence from Spain.

Political career 

In 1819, following the death of José María Peinado y Pezonarte, Barriere was appointed as the colonial intendant of the Intendancy of San Salvador, an intendancy of New Spain. On 15 September 1821, the Act of Independence of Central America was signed in Guatemala City, and Barriere remained as the political chief of San Salvador.

On 4 October 1821, Barriere ordered the arrests of Manuel José Arce, Domingo Antonio Lara, Juan Manuel Rodríguez, Manuel Castillo, and Mariano Fagoaga when they asked him to hold an election to send delegates to the Consultive Junta. He sent those he arrested to Guatemala, fearing that they would lead a popular revolution against him in El Salvador. Hearing of their arrest, José Matías Delgado led a movement against Barriere and the Consultive Junta declared Delgado as El Salvador's political chief. Barriere released the prisoners and was replaced by Delgado on 28 November 1821.

Death 

Barriere was killed during the Battle of Milingo on 18 May 1827 during the First Central American Civil War. He died fighting for Arce's forces against those of Francisco Morazán.

Personal life 

Barriere married Ana Paulina Pajares Palacios, who was the daughter of Antonio Victoriano Pajares and Juana Felipa Palacios.

See also 

President of El Salvador
Colonial Intendant of San Salvador

References

Citations

Bibliography

External links 

  Short biography at the Salvadoran government web site

Year of birth unknown
1827 deaths
Presidents of El Salvador
19th-century Salvadoran people
Salvadoran people of Spanish descent